Rhoderick Ramos Santos (born October 10, 1982), more commonly known as Erik Santos, is a Filipino singer, actor, TV host, commercial model, and the first Grand Champion of the ABS-CBN singing competition Star in a Million Season 1 in 2003. He has been referred to as the Prince of Pop. His debut album, This Is the Moment, was released in 2004 and went platinum.

His passion for music started during his childhood years. He participated in various singing competitions.
His best-selling albums, sold-out concerts and a demand for corporate shows, accolades from Awit Awards, Star Awards and Aliw Awards, endorsements for a bank (Bank of the Philippine Island's Express Remit), theme songs for radio stations, and even movies earned him an unusual popularity.
His first single, "Pagbigyang Muli", remained number one on WRR's hit chart for more than 20 weeks together with his other songs filling up the chart simultaneously.

Early life
Santos was born on October 10, 1982, in Malabon, Metro Manila, Philippines. When he was four, his passion for singing started. He participated in numerous small-town singing competitions.
He graduated in high school at Immaculate Conception Parochial School – Malabon.
He studied at the Centro Escolar University and took up dentistry, but later shifted to Psychology. As soon as he won the singing competition Star in a Million in 2003, he temporarily stopped studying, because of his busy schedule. Eventually, he came back to school and finished college. He graduated in March 2010.

Star in a Million
In 2003, Santos joined Star in a Million singing contest, and became part of the wildcard entry to the Final 10 of the show. He had a good start in the competition, but got eliminated during the third week of the show, when it was still a part of the Sunday noontime variety show ASAP. Nevertheless, his second chance came, and his rendition of R. Kelly's "I Believe I Can Fly", won him the tenth and final slot for the semi-finals round. Eventually he became one of the three grand finalists along with Sheryn Regis (first runner up) and Marinel Santos (2nd runner up) in the showdown for the title of Star in a Million. "This is the Moment", a song from the musical Jekyll & Hyde, popularized by Martin Nievera, won him the title.

He is the cousin of actor Wendell Ramos

Career
In 2004, Santos released his debut album This is the Moment, and it went platinum after three months of its release. After his debut, he released an extended play, quickly followed by his second album, Loving You Now. The album was released with the hit single "Bakit Ba Iniibig Ka", composed by Ogie Alcasid, and sung as a duet with Asia's Songbird Regine Velasquez. In December 2005, he held his first major solo concert at the Marikina Riverbanks. On October 19, 2007, he staged another major concert at the Araneta Coliseum, entitled Erik Santos ... Solo at the Coliseum, with Sam Milby, The Company, Nyoy Volante, Danita Paner, and Ai-Ai de las Alas as guests. On September 22, 2018, he held his 15th anniversary concert titled Er1k 5antos: My Greatest Moments at the Mall of Asia Arena.

Discography

Studio albums
2004 Star in a Million (Double Platinum)
2004 Star in a Million (Repackaged)
2004 This Is The Moment – first major solo album (Triple Platinum)
2005 I'll Never Go (CD-lite) (Platinum)
2005 Loving You Now (Platinum)
2006 Your Love (Gold)
2007 Your Love (Limited Platinum Edition) (Platinum)
2007 All I Want This Christmas (Gold)
2008 Face-Off (compilation of hits, with Christian Bautista)
2009 The Jim Brickman Songbook (Platinum)
2010 All I Want This Christmas (Repackaged)
2011 Awit Para Sa'Yo (Gold)
2013 The Erik Santos Collection (Gold)

Compilation albums
Love Life (Boy Abunda)
May Bukas Pa Tambayan Album
I-Star 15 OPM No. 1s
Himig Handog P-Pop Love Songs

EP
 I'll Never Go EP (2005)
 All I Want This Christmas (2007)

2× Platinum

Filmography

Television

Movies

Concerts

Headlining

Local

2004, Night of the Champions			Araneta Coliseum
with Sarah Geronimo, Rachelle Ann Go,
Mark Bautista and Christian Bautista

2004, The Prince of Pop and The Comedy 	Araneta Colieseum
Concert Queen Two Solos, 1 concert

2007, Pamaskong Handog ni Erik Santos 	Marikina Riverbanks
2008, OL4LUV						Araneta Coliseum
with Sarah Geronimo, Christian Bautista, 
Rachelle Ann Go

2009, SOLO 						Araneta Coliseum first major solo concert
2009, Pop Icons 						Araneta Coliseum  
with Christian Bautista, Piolo Pascual, 
Sam Milby and Mark Bautista
  
2010, Heartsongs 					Teatrino
Two-Nights; Valentine Concert

2010, Power of One 					Meralco Theater
Two-Nights;Solo Concert

2010, Extra Ordinary Songs				Aliw Theater
with Sitti  
 
2011, PowER IKons 					Music Museum
Two Nights; Solo Concert

2012, Greatest Themesongs				Meralco Theater
Two Nights; Solo Concert

2018, Er1k 5antos: My Greatest Moments                      SM Mall of Asia Arena
Two Nights; 
International

Canada Tour with Toni Gonzaga
The Prince of Pop and The Ultimate Performer (US Tour with Vina Morales)
Queens on Fire with Regine Velasquez and Pops Fernandez (ULTRA)
Queens on Fire US Tour
Champion Philippine and US tour
The Prince of Pop US Tour
Champions of the Heart Europe Tour
Christmas Is @ Marikina Riverbanks
 Casino Filipino Shows
 PAGCOR Shows
 Center For Pop Events

Awards and nominations

References

External links
Erik Santos Online – the official website
Erik Santos Online Forum – the official forum
STAR Records – Erik Santos

People from Malabon
Singing talent show winners
Participants in Philippine reality television series
Star Magic
Star Music artists
21st-century Filipino male singers
Filipino evangelicals
Filipino male film actors
1982 births
Living people
Reality show winners
Tenors
Singers from Metro Manila
ABS-CBN personalities
Centro Escolar University alumni
Filipino male television actors
Filipino television variety show hosts